is a Japanese manga series written and illustrated by Masakazu Ishiguro. It has been serialized in Kodansha's seinen manga magazine Monthly Afternoon since January 2018. An anime television series adaptation by Production I.G is set to premiere in April 2023.

Plot
In the outside world,fifteen years have passed since an unprecedented disaster that completely destroyed modern civilization. A group of children live in a facility isolated from the outside world. One day, one of them, a girl named Tokio, receives a message that says "Do you want to go outside?" Mimihime, another girl who lives in the same facility, has a prediction and tells the upset Tokio that two people will come from the outside to save her, one of whom has her same face, while the director of the school tells her that the outside world is Hell. Meanwhile, a boy named Maru, who looks just like Tokio, is traveling through this devastated Japan with a girl named Kiruko, in search of Heaven.

Characters

Media

Manga
Heavenly Delusion is written and illustrated by Masakazu Ishiguro. It has been serialized in Kodansha's seinen manga magazine Monthly Afternoon since January 25, 2018.<ref></p></ref> Kodansha has collected its chapters into individual tankōbon volumes. The first volume was released on July 23, 2018; a promotional video, directed by Tasuku Watanabe, for the first volume was released on the same date. As of November 22, 2022, eight volumes have been released.

In North America, the series is licensed for English language release by Denpa. The first volume was released on December 31, 2019.

Volume list

Anime
An anime television series adaptation produced by Production I.G was announced on October 18, 2022. The series will be directed by Hirotaka Mori, with scripts written by Makoto Fukami, character designs handled by Utsushita of Minakata Laboratory, and music composed by Kensuke Ushio. It is set to premiere on April 1, 2023, on Tokyo MX and other networks. The opening theme song, "Innocent Arrogance", is performed by BiSH, while the ending theme song, is performed by ASOBI. Disney Platform Distribution has acquired the license of distributing the anime and will stream the series worldwide on Disney+.

Other media
An official guidebook was released on November 22, 2022. It includes detailed information about the series' setting, story and characters and an interview with Ishiguro.

Reception
As of December 2018, the manga had over 130,000 copies in circulation.

Heavenly Delusion ranked at the first place on Takarajimasha's Kono Manga ga Sugoi! 2019 ranking of Top 20 manga series for male readers. In December 2019, Brutus magazine listed Heavenly Delusion on their "Most Dangerous Manga" list, which included works with the most "stimulating" and thought-provoking themes. Heavenly Delusion was one of the Jury Recommended Works at the 24th and 25th Japan Media Arts Festival in 2021 and 2022, respectively.

See also
And Yet the Town Moves, another manga series by the same author

References

Further reading

External links
 
 

2023 anime television series debuts
Anime series based on manga
Adventure anime and manga
Kodansha manga
Mystery anime and manga
Production I.G
Science fiction anime and manga
Seinen manga